Howard Redekopp is a Canadian Juno Award-winning record producer, mixer, writer, musician, and recording engineer best known for his work with Tegan and Sara and La Gusana Ciega.

Redekopp's production work has received two Grammy Award nominations and one Latin Grammy nomination. His work has played a significant role in the careers of Canadian artists such as Mother Mother, the New Pornographers, Dear Rouge, Said the Whale, and Scenic Route to Alaska.

Redekopp is a board member of the Music BC Industry Association and the founder of the record label How Weird Sounds.

Discography
 1997: Bossanova (engineer, mixer) – Bossanova
 1999: Tilt O'Whirl (producer, engineer, co-writer, bass, vocals) – Veal
 2000: Casual Viewin' (engineer) – 54-40
 2001: Casual Viewin' USA (engineer) – 54-40
 2002: Love Rush (producer, engineer, mixer) – 54-40
 2003: Goodbye Flatland (producer, engineer) – 54-40
 2003: Electric Version (engineer, mixer) – The New Pornographers
 2004: So Jealous (producer, engineer, mixer) – Tegan and Sara
 2004: The Slow Wonder (mixer) – A.C. Newman
 2004: Grab That Gun (engineer) – The Organ
 2004: Three (producer, engineer, mixer) – The Spitfires
 2004: You Know the Rules (mixer) – The Gay
 2004: Slang X Generator (producer, engineer, mixer) – Closed Caption Radio
 2004: Hanging the Battle-Scarred Pinata (engineer) – N.Q. Arbuckle
 2005: Mother (producer, engineer, mixer) – Mother Mother (rereleased in 2007 as Touch Up)
 2005: Twin Cinema (engineer) – The New Pornographers
 2005: The Survival Issue (producer, engineer, mixer) – Swank
 2006: Veins (producer, engineer, mixer) – The Paper Cranes
 2006: TV Heart Attack (producer, engineer, mixer) – TV Heart Attack
 2006: Anything (producer, engineer, mixer) – Kinnie Starr
 2006: Gossip Diet (producer, engineer, mixer) – Lotus Child
 2006: Hey, Sugar (mixer) – Bossanova
 2006: underneath the radio (engineer) – Goldenboy
 2007: It's Not Fun. Don't Do It! DVD (mixer) – Tegan and Sara
 2007: Diaries of a Broken Heart (producer, engineer, mixer) – Castle Project
 2007: Touch Up (producer, engineer, mixer) – Mother Mother
 2007: Schmancey (producer, engineer, mixer) – Fancey
 2007: Somewhere There's an Angel (producer, engineer, mixer) – The Thurston Revival
 2007: Key Principles (producer, engineer, mixer) – Nathan
 2007: Challengers (engineer) – The New Pornographers
 2008: Slimming Mirrors, Flattering Lights (producer, engineer, mixer) – The Awkward Stage
 2008: O My Heart (producer, engineer, mixer) – Mother Mother
 2009: Rearrange Beds (mixer) – An Horse
 2009: Territory (mixer) – Two Hours Traffic
 2009: XXXX (producer, engineer, mixer) – You Say Party! We Say Die!
 2009: Islands Disappear (producer, engineer, mixer) – Said the Whale
 2009: Sainthood (co-producer, engineer) – Tegan and Sara
 2010: This Is Good (producer, engineer, mixer; vocals) – Hannah Georgas
 2010: Tic Toc Tic (producer, engineer, mixer) – The Zolas
 2010: Spring Romance (producer, engineer, mixer) – Bend Sinister
 2010: Kidcutter (producer, engineer) – Fast Romantics
 2010: Cho Dependent (producer, engineer, mixer) – Margaret Cho
 2010: Flood (mixer) – Jeremy Fisher
 2011: I See Trouble (producer, engineer, mixer) – Rich Hope and his Evil Doers
 2011: Eureka (digital release) (mixer) – Mother Mother
 2011: Get Along (engineer, mixer) – Tegan and Sara
 2011: Walls (producer, engineer, mixer) – An Horse
 2011: Long Time Ago (mixer) – Current Swell
 2012: No Good Deed Goes Unpunished (mixer) – The Mocking Bird
 2012: Threads (producer, engineer, mixer) – Now, Now
 2012: Fine Times (producer, engineer, mixer) – Fine Times
 2012: Drive Me Home (producer, engineer) – The Reason
 2012: My Friends (producer, engineer, mixer) – Paper Lions
 2013: Fall of Romance (producer, engineer, mixer) – Imaginary Cities
 2013: Afterlife Blues (producer, engineer, mixer) – Fast Romantics
 2013: I Heard I Had (producer, engineer) – Dear Rouge
 2014: Engines (producer, engineer, mixer) – City Walls
 2014: No Bad Days (producer, engineer, mixer) – Bestie
 2014: Brill Bruisers (producer, engineer) – The New Pornographers
 2014: Monarca (producer, engineer, mixer) – La Gusana Ciega
 2014: All Is Bright - Baby Please Come Home (producer, engineer, mixer) – No Sinner
 2015: Pacific Gold (producer, engineer, mixer) – Timothy Jaromir
 2016: Inclusive Fitness (producer, engineer, mixer) – Strength of Materials

References

External links
 

Living people
Musicians from Vancouver
Canadian record producers
Year of birth missing (living people)
Place of birth missing (living people)